Jerónimo Gil (born June 8, 1973) is a Venezuelan actor.

Jerónimo dated fellow actress Flavia Gleske and they have two children together, Allison Gil Gleske and Alan Gil Gleske. However, the couple broke up after Jerónimo ran his car through Flavia's apartment front door.

Telenovelas
1998: Hoy te Vi as Johnny Fuentes
1999: Mujer Secreta as Danilo Bejarano
2000: Mis 3 Hermanas as Dr. Gustavo Martínez
2000: Angélica Pecado
2001: A Calzón Quitao as Paulino Almeida
2001: Carissima as Hector Coronel
2002: Mi Gorda Bella as Franklin Carreño
2004: ¡Qué buena se puso Lola! as Jorge (Benavides) Avellaneda
2006: Por todo lo alto as Alcides Urquiaga
2007: Mi prima Ciela as Abel Méndez
2009: Condesa por Amor as Fernando
2009: Los misterios del amor as Edwin Santeliz
2010: La mujer perfecta as Beto Pimentel
2012: Nacer Contigo as Caín Bermúdez
2015: Amor Secreto as Dr. Edgar Ventura

References

External links
 
 JERONIMO GIL at 

1973 births
Living people
Venezuelan male telenovela actors
21st-century Venezuelan male actors
People from Carúpano